Route 31 is a highway in northwestern Missouri.  Its northern terminus is at U.S. Route 169 in northwestern De Kalb County; its southern terminus is at US 169 southeast of St. Joseph.  

Route 31 was one of the original 1922 state highways.  Its northern terminus was originally five miles further north in King City at Route 4.  That section of Route 31 became part of U.S. Route 169.

Route Description 
Route 31 begins in Buchanan County, at the intersection of US Route 169 and 120 SE Road, where it heads northward. It passes through Easton, where a T intersection is formed with Route N, before meeting with US Route 36. Route 31 runs east, concurrent with 36, where it moves into DeKalb County, before they split at the intersection with Spruce Road.

After the split, Route 31 runs north to meet Missouri Route 6, where they run concurrently. The routes run through Clarksdale after the merge, before they turn east and split. Route 31 runs north, before once again meeting with US 169 at the former's northern terminus.

Junction List

References

031
Transportation in DeKalb County, Missouri
Transportation in Clinton County, Missouri
Transportation in Buchanan County, Missouri